Cleveland Independent School District is a public school district based in Cleveland, Texas (USA).

In addition to Cleveland, the district serves the cities of North Cleveland and Plum Grove as well as portions of San Jacinto and Montgomery counties.

In 2009, the school district was rated "academically acceptable" by the Texas Education Agency.

Schools

High schools
6A Classification
 Cleveland High School (Grades 9-12)

Middle schools
Cleveland Middle School (Grades 6-8)

Elementary schools
Cottonwood Elementary (Grades Pre-K -5)
Eastside Elementary (Grades Pre-K -5)
Northside Elementary (Grades Pre-K -5)
Southside Elementary (Grades Pre-K -5)
Pine Burr Elementary (Grades Pre-K -5)

References

External links
Cleveland ISD

School districts in Liberty County, Texas
School districts in San Jacinto County, Texas
School districts in Montgomery County, Texas